Strephonota sphinx is a species of butterfly of the family Lycaenidae. It is found in Panama, Colombia, the Amazon, Bolivia, Peru and the Guianas.

References

Butterflies described in 1775
Theclinae
Lycaenidae of South America
Taxa named by Johan Christian Fabricius